The drink industry (or drinks industry, also known as the beverage industry) produces drinks, in particular ready to drink products. Drink production can vary greatly depending on the product being made. ManufacturingDrinks.com explains that "bottling facilities differ in the types of bottling lines they operate and the types of products they can run". Drinks may be canned or bottled (plastic or glass), hot-fill or cold-fill, and natural or conventional. Innovations in the drink industry, catalysed by requests for non-alcoholic drinks, include drink plants, drink processing, and drink packing.

Largest companies
The largest global players in 2019 were:

See also

 Alcoholic beverage industry in Europe
 Container-deposit legislation
 Food industry
 Brewing industry
 List of drinks
 Alcoholic drink
 Soft drink
 Bottled water
 Beverage Digest

References

Further reading
 Principles of Food, Beverage, and Labor Cost Controls. Paul R. Dittmer, J. Desmond Keefe. John Wiley & Sons. 3 December 2008
 

 
Drinks
Industries (economics)